Arthur Häggblad (14 August 1908 – 16 June 1989) was a Swedish cross-country skier who competed in the 1930s. He won a bronze medal in the 4 × 10 km relay at the 1936 Winter Olympics in Garmisch-Partenkirchen. Häggblad's best individual finishes were fourth in both the 18 km and 50 km events at the 1934 FIS Nordic World Ski Championships. He would also win a bronze medal in the 4 × 10 km relay at those championships.

In 1933, 1935, 1937 and 1940, he won Vasaloppet.

Häggblad was known for his blunt public statements. For example, when a governor once asked him in the 1930s how was the race, he replied "Run for yourself, you old bastard – so you can see how it feels."

After retiring from competitions Häggblad worked in a sports store. He was featured in the 1988 documentary film De sista skidåkarna (The Last Skiers).

Cross-country skiing results
All results are sourced from the International Ski Federation (FIS).

Olympic Games
 1 medal – (1 bronze)

World Championships
 1 medal – (1 bronze)

References

External links

DatabaseOlympics.com profile

1908 births
1989 deaths
People from Nordmaling Municipality
Cross-country skiers at the 1936 Winter Olympics
Swedish male cross-country skiers
Vasaloppet winners
Olympic medalists in cross-country skiing
FIS Nordic World Ski Championships medalists in cross-country skiing
Medalists at the 1936 Winter Olympics
IFK Umeå skiers
Olympic bronze medalists for Sweden
20th-century Swedish people